The United States collegiate records in track and field are the best marks in track and field events from collegiate athletes (of any nationality), done while the athletes were competing for an American institution of higher education.

The National Collegiate Athletic Association (NCAA) track and field system from which all collegiate records currently come from has been touted as one of the main reasons for the success of the United States on the global stage of athletics.

In the case of outdoor record-breaking performances achieved during the summer after the relevant national collegiate spring track and field championship (for example, the NCAA Division I Outdoor Track and Field Championships) has passed, both the best summer mark and the best in-season mark are listed.

Some of the records are maintained by the U.S. Track & Field and Cross Country Coaches Association or the Track & Field News publication.

Outdoor
Key:

+ = en route to a longer distance
A = assisted by altitude
h = hand timing
OT = oversized indoor track (greater than 200m in circumference)
PS = mark made in postseason after the spring collegiate national championships

Men

Women

Indoor

Men

Women

Notes

References
General
USTFCCCA Collegiate Records – Outdoor 23 August 2022 updated
USTFCCCA Collegiate Records – Indoor 4 March 2023 updated
Specific

External links
USTFCCCA Official Website

National records in athletics (track and field)
Track and field in the United States
Track and field, collegiate
 
College sports records and statistics in the United States